

Background
Kangaroos are not farmed for human or pet food consumption like livestock are - they are shot in the wild at night by commercial shooters. This separates them from the agriculture industry. Evidence shows that they are frequently not killed by the first bullet (up to 40%)  and reports have documented horrific injuries, including cases of jaws being blown off. Due to the uncontrolled conditions of kangaroo ‘harvesting’, these types of injuries are becoming more commonplace. Kangaroos are moving targets, and typically being shot from an unstable platform (e.g. ute/open tray four-wheel drive), and it is therefore a far cry from the controlled stunning of a stationary animal in an abattoir.
When a female kangaroo with a joey is killed, and in instances where the joey is not left to starve, freeze, or die from stress or predation  the joeys are bludgeoned to death by a ‘concussive blow’, and decapitation or cervical dislocation (can be used on joeys without fur)  as a ‘solution’ for disposal, described as a ‘humane’ solution  by the kangaroo meat code of practice. Joeys are waste products of the commercial ‘harvesting’ industry and are also not counted in kill figures 

In reference to the disposal of joeys and in response to the RSPCA’s decision to ban the sale of kangaroo meat at its facilities nationally, ABC News Australia quotes the ‘National Code of Practice for the Shooting of Kangaroos and Wallabies for Commercial purposes, which states:

"The concussive blow must be conducted so that the joey's head is hit against a large solid surface that will not move or compress during the impact (e.g., the tray of a utility vehicle).” 

It is also critical to appreciate that once a gunshot has been fired into a mob of kangaroos, they are going to start panicking and will become extremely flighty, even further decreasing the chance of an accurate lethal head shot to the brain. Joeys at-foot also flee out of fear only to later die of the abovementioned (predation, stress, starvation, or exposure/freezing to death).

It is a misperception and a fallacy that shooters do not kill female kangaroos, reports stating that about 30% of kangaroos killed are female. It is important to appreciate that shooters are undertaking the killing at night, from a distance, and that kangaroos are fast moving and skittish targets. In most cases, it would therefore be almost impossible to accurately determine their gender (also if they are of advanced age or unwell). For example, Honorary Associate Professor David Brooks from the University of Sydney stated:

(That) “As many as one in three kangaroos shot is nevertheless female”. (That) “The industry does take some of these – one presumes only the largest – but most are left in the field. It’s also estimated that at least two in three of females shot have joeys in the pouch, and that at as many of these females shot have an at-foot joey nearby when their killing occurs” 

The Australian Society for Kangaroos reports that:

“...Despite claims by industry representatives that females are no longer targeted by the kangaroo 'harvest' industry, hundreds of thousands of lactating female kangaroos continue to be slaughtered annually by this industry leaving their pouch young to die a barbaric, slow and painful death and their at-foot young abandoned and left to die alone from stress, starvation, dehydration, predation and exposure.”

RSPCA Bans the Sale of Kangaroo Meat due to ‘Animal Welfare Concerns’
In October 2022, the RSPCA announced it is withdrawing products containing kangaroo meat from its shelves due to “concerns about animal welfare implications in the sourcing of these products” 

Think Tank for Kangaroos (THINKK) suggested that, “although the RSPCA assessment of shooters (in 1985 & 2002) showed 98% accuracy this was affected by observer bias, whereas some research by individuals that has involved sampling of carcasses has found as many as 40% of animals may have been miss-shot (not killed by a single headshot)” 

Since that report, the RSPCA’s deep concerns about animal welfare and ethics in the industry was clearly demonstrated when in 2021 they recommended that kangaroo shooters “wear body cameras” “so the industry can demonstrate compliance with the commercial code given the limited resources to physically monitor shooting locations at night”.  “The RSPCA argued that the current system does not allow verification of whether kangaroos have been killed with a headshot because kangaroos that are injured or escape may not be reported and the heads of the animals are removed in the field.”

Inaccurate Assessment of Population Numbers and ‘Pest’ Status

The kangaroo population data used to determine the numbers of kangaroos that can be harvested is extremely flawed. The numbers are so over-inflated that it is not actually biologically possible for kangaroos to breed at these rates, demonstrating that the data used to determine kangaroo population numbers is not scientifically sound.

Additionally, the 2019 to 2020 bushfires caused the loss of an estimated 3 billion vertebrate native animals. This monumental loss is compounded by the severe threats from drought, land clearing, urban sprawl, invasive introduced species, and the immense number of wildlife killed by vehicle strikes every year – these factors are also not considered when population numbers are estimated.

Victorian Kangaroo Alliance states; “Independent scientists have long been raising the alarm that government statistics are deeply flawed (that) for example, DELWP estimated 7000 kangaroos on the Mornington Peninsula and yet a rigorous count on the ground overseen by Dr Greg Holland found only 2200. The quotas are based on the government’s estimates regardless of how incorrect they are. (Also that) The most recent Victorian count in 2021 showed a 40% increase in kangaroos over 2 years, which, even if we hadn’t had drought and catastrophic bushfires, would be double the biologically possible rate of increase” 

When commenting on the accuracy of kangaroo population numbers for ‘harvesting’, Honorary Associate Professor David Brooks (University of Sydney) in 2022 stated:

“The basic data from which population estimates are determined is gathered through aerial surveys ... An aircraft flies low over a portion of a zone, sweeping methodically back and forth so as to cover as much of the area as deemed necessary to provide a reliable indication of overall population That the number of kangaroos counted from the air is not the number of kangaroos on the ground” 

(He continues to say) “In order to compensate for kangaroos thus missed, a correction factor is applied to the number of kangaroos actually seen. A factor of (multiplication by) 2.0, for example, would mean that, for every kangaroo seen, it is assumed there is one further kangaroo not seen; a correction factor of 3.0 would suggest that, for every kangaroo seen, there are a further two who have not been seen. The correction factor varies according to terrain. Depending upon terrain and other factors, seven kangaroos seen, when it comes to setting a figure on paper, may become fourteen, or twenty-one, etc.” 

Associate Professor Brooks continues to demonstrate how these population number estimates can therefore be easily grossly overestimated. For example, the 508 wallaroos counted in the Northern Tablelands survey area in 2019, adjusted by a correction factor of 1.85 and with certain minor accommodations made for varying terrain, etc., became an estimated wallaroo population of 296,555 for the 48,000 square kilometre Northern Tablelands Kangaroo Management Zone, a figure 583 times larger (as some commentators have pointed out) than the number of wallaroos actually sighted in a survey of little more than one quarter (0.28) of one percent of the total area of the zone. 

In addition to this, Brooks continues to also demonstrate that these methods of population counting go against biology and science. For example, the decline in eastern grey kangaroo numbers registered in the Cobar area in 2019 are extremely alarming, showing a “drop of 91% from 81,391 in 2018 to 7,317 in 2019” due to drought. Yet, the following year the population is reported to be 45,000 and an increase in the population of 504% - an increase that is biologically not possible 

Associate Professor Brooks continues explain that “Kangaroos breed slowly and have a high juvenile mortality (c.73%), that maximum wild population growth rates average approximately 10% in optimum conditions, with annual declines of up to 60% during drought, and that cull rates even as ‘low’ as 15-20% therefore exceed population growth rates.”  Even in a very good year, a kangaroo population is unlikely to grow at a rate much exceeding 12%, let alone a rate of 200, 400, or even 500% as official tables have stated. 

WIRES, stated:

“Population estimates used to justify annual hunting quotas are inflated and do not take into account the slow reproduction rates of kangaroos. Environmental impacts such as drought, fires and loss of habitat that lead to reductions in numbers of animals as well as non-commercial hunting are not factored into these estimates at all.” 

The Animal Justice Party states, “The commercial kangaroo industry has made kangaroos the victims of the largest slaughter of land-based wildlife on the planet”.  It is a shameful hypocrisy when one considers that Australia took Japan to the International Court of Justice over whale hunting.

Kangaroo Leather
Various products are made from the skins of the animals. Kangaroo leather is a strong, light leather, which is more stretchy than goat or cattle but also wrinkles more easily and darkens faster. It is commonly used for shoes, motorcycle suits, handbags, wallets and in whips. Big brands usually market it as “k-leather”. Since many people see kangaroos as pest animals (and numbers have to be limited with annual culling) using the leather, when the meat is also utilized is seen as sustainable.

See also

Emu industry
Koala industry
Kangaroo leather

References

Agriculture in Australia
Hunting in Australia
Industry in Australia
Macropods